Kokopelli Records was a record label established by jazz flautist Herbie Mann and Jim Geisler in 1994. Other than Mann's recordings, Kokopelli releases included David "Fathead" Newman, Jimmy Rowles, and April Barrows. Mann had previously established Embryo Records while working for Atlantic Records.

Discography
 1994: Deep Pocket – Herbie Mann
 1994: Opalescence – Herbie Mann
 1994: Lilac Time – Jimmy Rowles
 1994: Mr. Gentle Mr. Cool: A Tribute to Duke Ellington – David "Fathead" Newman, Ron Carter, Lewis Nash
 1994: I'll Be Seeing You – Bobby Myhre
 1995: Peace Pieces – Herbie Mann
 1995: Black Orpheus – Trio da Paz
 1995: Blue River – Steve Barta
 1996: Edward Simon – Edward Simon
 1996: Under Woodstock Moon – David "Fathead" Newman
 1995: The Planet Is Alive...Let it Live! – Sarah Vaughan
 1995: Urban Renewel – Bobby Watson
 1996: Dark Hero – Sam Riney
 1995: Storyteller – Ricardo Silveira
 1996: Bop N Blues – Cornell Dupree
 1995: River Wide – Brasilia
 1996: Facing Wes – Ronald Muldrow
 1996: Portrait of Silk Thread by Dutch Jazz Orchestra
 1997: Nic Nacs – Nicolas Bearde
 1998: Steppin Out – The Braxton Brothers
 1998: Sliding In – Pete McGuinness
 1998: Best Kept Secret by Positive ID

References

See also
Herbie Mann discography

American record labels
Jazz record labels
Herbie Mann albums